Benjamin Ulmann, French (Alsatian) Jewish painter, born at Blotzheim (Haut Rhin) in 1829, was a pupil of Michel Martin Drolling and of François-Édouard Picot, and entered the Ecole des Beaux Arts in 1849. He gained the prix de Rome in 1859, and profited much by his studies in Italy. He exhibited a number of works at the Salon from 1855 onwards, chiefly portraits and historical subjects, and was commissioned to paint some pictures for the Palais Royal and for the Palais de Justice. His Sylla and Manus is in the Luxembourg Palace, and other works by him are in the Museums of Mans, Marseilles, Melun, and Colmar. He died in 1884.

References

Attribution:

External links
Benjamin Ulmann in the collection of the Dahesh Museum of Art

1829 births
1884 deaths
People from Haut-Rhin
Alsatian Jews
19th-century French painters
French male painters
Jewish painters
École des Beaux-Arts alumni
Prix de Rome for painting
Chevaliers of the Légion d'honneur
19th-century French male artists